is a private university in Abiko, Chiba, Japan, established in 1966. The predecessor of the school was founded in 1904.

Alumni 
 Tatsuya Kawajiri, professional Mixed Martial Artist in the UFC's Featherweight Division
 Mikio Shimoji, a politician

References

External links
 Official website 

Educational institutions established in 1904
Private universities and colleges in Japan
Universities and colleges in Chiba Prefecture
Abiko, Chiba
1904 establishments in Japan